Janice Laking, (née McCuaig) is a Canadian retired politician, who served as mayor of Barrie, Ontario from 1988 to 2000.

The daughter of former Simcoe North federal Member of Parliament Duncan Fletcher McCuaig, Laking was first elected to Barrie City Council in 1972. She was nominated in 1978 as the Liberal Party of Canada's candidate in Simcoe South in the 1979 federal election, but later withdrew to mount a campaign for mayor against incumbent Ross Archer. She lost that election, but was re-elected to a council seat in 1980 and served for another eight years before being elected mayor in 1988. In 1991, she won her second term in office by acclamation.

She was the Liberal candidate for Simcoe Centre in the 1993 federal election, losing by a margin of 123 votes to Reform Party candidate Ed Harper. This was the only riding in the entire province not won by a Liberal in that election, and media generally credited Harper's victory to the fact that Laking was such a popular mayor that the voters didn't want her to leave the mayor's chair.

She won reelection to the mayoralty in 1994 and 1997.

She was defeated by Jim Perri in 2000, and subsequently served as a citizenship judge. She is also an honorary colonel of CFB Borden's 16 Wing unit.

References

1930s births
Mayors of Barrie
Candidates in the 1993 Canadian federal election
Women mayors of places in Ontario
Canadian citizenship judges
Living people
20th-century Canadian women politicians
Ontario candidates for Member of Parliament
Liberal Party of Canada candidates for the Canadian House of Commons